Let's Go All the Way may refer to:
 
 Let's Go All the Way (album), a 1985 album by Sly Fox
 "Let's Go All the Way" (song), the title song
 "Let's Go All the Way", a song by Average White Band from Aftershock
 "Let's Go All the Way", a song by Norma Jean
 "Let's Go All the Way", a song by Raydio from Raydio
 "Let's Go All the Way", a song by React

See also
 Go All the Way (disambiguation)